The following events took place at the 2006 Commonwealth Games.

Events